Etkywan (Etekwe), or Icen (Itchen), also known as Kentu or Nyidu, is a Jukunoid language of Nigeria.

References

Jukunoid languages
Languages of Nigeria